The Metro is a supermini car, later a city car that was produced by British Leyland (BL) and, later, the Rover Group from 1980 to 1998. It was launched in 1980 as the Austin mini Metro. It was intended to complement and eventually replace the Mini, and was developed under the codename LC8. The Metro was named by What Car? magazine as 'Car of The Year' in 1983 as an MG, and again as the Rover Metro in 1991.

During its 18-year lifespan, the Metro wore many names: Austin Metro, MG Metro and Rover Metro. It was rebadged as the Rover 100 series in December 1994. There were also van versions known as the Morris Metro and later, Metrovan.

At the time of its launch, the Metro was sold under the Austin brand. From 1982, MG versions became available. During 1987, the car lost the Austin name, and was sold simply as the Metro.  From 1990 until its withdrawal in 1998, the Metro was sold only as a Rover.

Although the R3 generation Rover 200 (introduced in 1995 and smaller than previous 200 models) had originally been designed as a replacement for the Metro, it was not marketed as such after its launch. The Rover 100 finally ceased production in 1998, being outlived (by three years) by the original Mini that it was meant to replace. 2,078,218 Metros of all types were built.



Austin/MG Metro

Plans for a replacement for the Mini had been afoot within BL since the early 1970s, but none of the concepts conceived got beyond the initial design stages, largely due to a shortage of funds at British Leyland, and its eventual bankruptcy and government bail-out in 1975. The modern supermini market had evolved during the 1970s, with earlier mini-cars like the Mini and Hillman Imp being followed by mostly larger cars with the "hatchback" bodystyle – beginning with the Fiat 127 in 1971 and Renault 5 in 1972, with the next five years seeing the arrival of similar cars including the Ford Fiesta and Volkswagen Polo, as well as the Vauxhall Chevette from General Motors (also built in West Germany as the Opel Kadett) which was also available as a saloon and estate as well as a hatchback. These cars gained a decent sized market share in Britain and most other European markets.

On 8 October 1980, BL introduced the Austin Mini Metro. The roots of the Metro lay in an earlier project denoted as ADO88 (Amalgamated Drawing Office, 88-inch wheelbase), which was intended to be a direct replacement for the Mini.  However, poor reception to the ADO88 design at customer clinics and the increasing dominance of superminis in the ADO88's intended market segment, forced a major change in the project's focus. In late 1977, ADO88 was given an eleventh hour redesign, to make it both larger and less utilitarian in appearance and more upmarket in nature, becoming BL's first supermini, rather than an economy car. The revised project was given the new designator LC8 (Leyland Cars Number 8), and the definitive Metro design would ultimately emerge under the leadership of BL's chief stylists David Bache and Harris Mann. LC8 would replace the more upmarket, lower-volume Clubman versions of the Mini and the lower-spec, smaller-engined variants of the Austin Allegro (which would be fully replaced in the early 1980s by project LC10, which became Austin Maestro). The ADO88 project had experimented with new engines and suspension systems, but with limited time and budgets, LC8 would reuse much of the Mini's engineering (the A-Series engine with front-wheel drive via a sump-mounted four-speed transmission, and front and rear running gear carried in steel subframes separate from the unitary bodyshell) and borrow the Hydragas suspension system developed for the Allegro. However while much was shared conceptually with older BL models, LC8 would see these design elements heavily re-engineered and modernised. For instance the A-Series drivetrain was extensively updated with new materials and tooling to become the A-Plus while the new car would feature 12-inch wheels and all LC8s would have servo-assisted four-piston front disc brakes with fully split hydraulic systems, as opposed to the standard Mini which at the time still had 10-inch wheels and all-round drum brakes. These new drivetrains, wheels, brakes and many other featured developed for the LC8 would be introduced to the Mini in the near future, updating the 30-year old design at minimal extra cost and providing highly desirable economies of scale given the anticipated sales volumes of the new car. This would make it cost effective for the more basic versions of the Mini to remain in production as an entry-level model for BL, in place of the position originally intended for ADO88 while allowing LC8 to compete head-on with the existing superminis. 

Following the Ryder Report, which prioritized the ADO88/LC8 project, Longbridge would be expanded in 1978 with a £200m robotised body assembly line (known as the "New West Works") to enable it to produce the new model which it was hoped would sell 100,000 or more units a year in Britain alone; production of the smaller Mini and larger Allegro was also pruned back to enable the plant to produce as many units of the Metro as possible, with the Allegro finally being axed in 1982 to make way for the Maestro.

The hatchback body shell was one of the most spacious of its time and this was a significant factor in its popularity. The space efficient interior was also lauded for the novel 60/40 split rear seat which was standard on higher specification models.  The original Mk.1 Metros also featured David Bache's signature "symmetric" dashboard design (also used on the Range Rover and the Rover SD1), where the main dashboard moulding consists of a shelf, onto which the instrument binnacle is simply mounted on the left or the right hand side – this arrangement saves the tooling cost of two separate dashboard mouldings for right and left-hand drive.  Initially, the Metro was sold as a three-door hatchback only (as were most of its competitors), with a choice of 998cc (1.0 litre) or 1275cc (1.3-litre) petrol engines. The 1.0 and 1.0L cars and the future van had recessed headlamps with indicators and sidelights in the bumper, whereas the 1.0HLE, 1.3S, and 1.3HLS had each headlight and indicator together as one flush fitting unit.

The name was chosen through a ballot of BL employees. They were offered a choice of three names, Match, Maestro or Metro. Once the result was announced, the manufacturer of trains and buses, Metro Cammell, objected to the use of the Metro name by BL. The issue was resolved by BL promising to advertise the car only as the "Mini Metro", although after a while the Mini Metro name disappeared. There were also van versions, introduced in late 1982, known as the Morris Metro. From late 1985, after the Morris name had been discontinued, it was sold as the Austin Metro 310, and after the Austin badge was also dropped it became simply the Metrovan 310.

A two-door saloon model was included in the Metro's development which would have been similar in concept to the Vauxhall Chevette saloon as well as the Volkswagen Polo-based Derby. However, by the time production of the Metro began, it was decided not to include a saloon version, this niche being filled by the Mini remaining in production, and only a few of the Metro's competitors were available as a saloon.

BL's last all-new mass-produced car before the Metro's launch was the 1976 Rover SD1.

One of the consequences was that there was enormous public interest in the car from well before its launch. The company chose to stage the launch presentations for dealers and major company car buyers on board a cruise ship, the MS Vistafjord. This launch event took place over a three-week period in September 1980 sailing between West Gladstone Dock in Liverpool and the Isle of Man, where guests could drive the car, so long as sea conditions allowed them to land by tender as there was no dock facility for the ship. The news broke in the national newspapers a full year ahead of the public launch with The Sun, among others, carrying the story. It was finally revealed to the public on the press day of the British Motor Show with the British Prime Minister, Margaret Thatcher, in attendance.

The Metro quickly proved popular with buyers, a 19-year-old Lady Diana Spencer buying one of the early examples, and was regularly seen in it being hounded by the paparazzi just before her marriage to Prince Charles in July 1981. Even then, during the early part of its production life, it was the best selling mini-car in the UK, before being eclipsed by the updated Ford Fiesta in 1984. Its clever interior design made it spacious considering its dimensions, and Hydragas suspension gave surprisingly good ride and handling. Its updated A+ series 1.0 and 1.3-litre OHV engines hardly represented the cutting edge in performance, but they were strong on economy.

In its best year, 1983, more than 130,000 Metros were sold in Britain, only the Ford Escort and Sierra outsold it. This was despite the arrival of a host of new superminis on the British market that year – the Ford Fiesta received a major facelift, and four all-new superminis (the Vauxhall Nova, Fiat Uno, Nissan Micra and Peugeot 205) went on sale in Britain between April and September.

 
A major TV advertising campaign was created by the London agency, Leo Burnett which came up with the headline "a British car to beat the world". The advert also featured the similar-sized Fiat 127, Renault 5, Volkswagen Polo and Datsun Cherry as "foreign invaders" and the voiceover spoke of the Metro's ability to "send the foreigners back where they came from". Following the launch of the Austin Maestro in 1983, less of British Leyland's advertising was focused on the Metro. The Maestro initially sold very well, but within five years sales were declining sharply, although it remained in production until 1994.

During 1981, British Leyland confirmed that the Metro range would soon be expanded with more luxurious and high performance versions. The Metro range was expanded in May 1982 to include the luxury Vanden Plas trim level on the Austins and higher performance MG Badged versions; the MG Metro marked a quick comeback for the marque previously used on sports cars until the Abingdon plant making the MG B closed in 1980. The Metro Vanden Plas featured higher levels of luxury and equipment, while the slightly more powerful MG Metro 1.3 sold as a sports model (0–60 mph in 10.9 seconds, top speed 103 mph). The Vanden Plas variant received the same MG engine from 1984 onwards (with the exception of the VP Automatic, which retained the  1275 cc unit). The luxury fittings marking out the Metro Vanden Plas took the form of a radio-cassette player, electric front windows, an improved instrument panel with tachometer, and a variety of optional extras such as trip computer, leather trim, remote boot release, and front fog lamps.

The changes between the MG engine (taken directly from the Mini Cooper) and the standard 1275 included a modified cylinder head, with larger valves and improved porting, altered cam profile and larger carburettor leading to a 20% increase in BHP to 72 bhp. At the October 1982 Birmingham Motor Show the MG Metro Turbo variant was first shown. With a quoted bhp of 93, 0–60 mph in 9.9 seconds, and top speed of  this car had few direct competitors at the time, although the growing demand for "hot hatches" meant that it soon had a host of competitors including the Ford Fiesta XR2, Peugeot 205 GTI and Renault 5 GT Turbo. This model had a few addition modifications bolted on over the normally aspirated MG model to give an additional 21 bhp. Aside from the turbocharger and exhaust system itself, and what was (at the time) a relatively sophisticated boost delivery and control system, the MG Turbo variant incorporated stiffer suspension (purportedly with engineering input from Lotus), and an uprated crankshaft of nitrided steel and sodium-cooled exhaust valves.

Both MG variants were given a "sporty" interior with red seat belts, red carpets and a sports-style steering wheel. Early Turbo models also benefitted from a boost pressure gauge - in pre-84 models this was an in-dash LED gauge, relocating to an LCD gauge mounted in an overhead console for early mkII facelift models (with the boost gauge subsequently being deleted from production in post-85 models).  The Turbo also received alloy wheels, wheel arch extensions and front spoiler, and prominent "Turbo" branding.  While it retained rear drums, the front disc brakes were changed to ventilated discs, with ventilated front disks being standardised and adopted by all variants from mkII onwards.  Later MG variants were emblazoned with MG branding both inside and out, which only served to fuel claims of badge engineering from some of the more steadfast MG enthusiasts.  Others believed that this sentiment was unfounded, particularly in the case of the Turbo variant, due to the undeniably increased performance and handling when compared to the non-MG models.  From 1983, the MG badge also found its way onto higher performance versions of the Maestro, and shortly afterwards it was adopted for higher-performance versions of the Montego.

A facelift in October 1984 saw revised styling modifications to the Metro's front end including much needed colour-coding such as body coloured bumpers on MG versions, wider suspension subframes, along with a new dashboard design featuring the switches and instruments matching that of the Maestro and Montego.  The new dashboard was constructed from fewer but larger plastic mouldings, making it easier to assemble and reducing the potential for rattles and other fitting issues. A major part of the facelift was the introduction of a five-door Metro: This provided another strong selling point for the Metro in the 1980s, since not only did it already boast a spacious and practical cabin for its size, but some of its slightly larger competitors, such as the Ford Fiesta and Volkswagen Polo, did not offer the option of five doors at the time. From 1989, just before the Metro was replaced, three-door versions were given a raised fuel filler, this also coincided with the cars being able to run on unleaded petrol due to hardened exhaust valve seats, three years before EEC regulations made it compulsory for all new cars to have a catalytic converter or fuel injection. 

A rear spoiler reduced drag coefficient to increase the Metro's already good fuel economy, and the hydraulic clutch (often berated as the cause of the Metro's particularly harsh gearchange) was replaced by a self-adjusting cable-operated mechanism. The lack of a five-speed gearbox would become a major drawback as time went on; the BMC sump-mounted gearbox was never developed to accommodate an extra gear ratio, which was a severe handicap against the opposition – by the mid-1980s the Ford Fiesta, Peugeot 205, Fiat Uno and Opel Corsa/Vauxhall Nova were all available with a five-speed gearbox on larger-engine models.

The Austin Metro was a huge seller in Britain, with more than 1 million being sold over a 10-year production run. The MK3 Ford Escort (1980–1986) was the only single model to outsell it in Britain throughout the 1980s, and by December 1989 only the MK3 Ford Escort was a more common model on British roads. However, the first three generations of Ford Fiesta combined outnumbered it by this stage.

October 2010 marked the 30th anniversary of the launch of the Metro, by now a very rare sight on Britain's roads.

Launch prices
 MiniMetro 1.0 £3,095
 MiniMetro 1.0L £3,495
 MiniMetro 1.0HLE £3,695
 MiniMetro 1.3S £3,995
 MiniMetro 1.3HLS £4,296

Engines
All Metros were powered by the 4-cylinder A-Series engine, in 0.85-, 1.0- and 1.3-litre options. Outputs varied depending on year and trim level, with a low-compression 1.0-litre option available on lower-specification models suitable for 2-star petrol, an 0.85-litre option available in some South American countries; no other market existed for this engine size.

 1980-**: 848 cc A-Series I4,  at 5500 rpm and 44 lb·ft (60 Nm) at 2900 rpm (** = Date last car officially sold is currently unknown)
 1980–83: 998 cc A-Series I4,  at 5400 rpm and 53 lb·ft (73 Nm) at 3000 rpm 
 1983–88: 998 cc A-Series I4,  at 5500 rpm and 54 lb·ft (73 Nm) at 3250 rpm (low compression option)
 1983–87: 998 cc A-Series I4,  at 5500 rpm and 54 lb·ft (73 Nm) at 3250 rpm (Metro City)
 1983–87: 998 cc A-Series I4,  at 5500 rpm and 54 lb·ft (73 Nm) at 3250 rpm (Metro Standard/City X)
 1980–84: 998 cc A-Series I4,  at 5500 rpm and 54 lb·ft (73 Nm) at 3250 rpm (Metro HLE)
 1987–90: 998 cc A-Series I4,  at 5500 rpm and 54 lb·ft (73 Nm) at 3250 rpm
 1980–83: 1275 cc A-Series I4,  at 5250 rpm and 72 lb·ft (98 Nm) at 3200 rpm
 1983–90: 1275 cc A-Series I4,  at 5300 rpm and 72 lb·ft (98 Nm) at 3100 rpm
 1984–89: 1275 cc A-Series I4, 71 hp (54 kW) at 6000 rpm and 75 lb·ft (99 Nm) at 4000 rpm (Metro Vanden Plas)
 1982–89: 1275 cc A-Series I4, 72 hp (54 kW) at 6000 rpm and 75 lb·ft (99 Nm) at 4000 rpm (MG Metro)
 1983–89: 1275 cc A-Series turbo I4, 93 hp (69 kW) at 6130 rpm and 85 lb·ft (115 Nm) at 2650 rpm (MG Metro Turbo)
 1989–90: 1275 cc A-Series I4, 69 hp (54 kW) at 5450 rpm and 75 lb·ft (99 Nm) at 4000 rpm (Metro GTa/MG Metro)

Rover Metro

At the end of 1987, the Austin marque was shelved. The Austin badge was removed from the cars, which continued to be manufactured with no marque badge, just a model name badge. Rover management never allowed Rover badges on the Montego or the Maestro in their home market, although they were sometimes referred to as "Rovers" in the press and elsewhere. They wore badges that were the same shape as the Rover longship badge, but which did not say "Rover". By this stage, Rover was in the final stages of developing the new Rover 200 Series and Rover 400 Series models in conjunction with Honda, and it was also working on a replacement for the Metro. 

During the 1980s, the media had published photographs of the "Austin AR6" concept car, which would have been a completely new design, but towards the end of the decade Rover decided to restyle and reengineer the existing Metro design instead.

The new Rover Metro was finally launched in May 1990, being a heavily revised version of the original Metro and fitted with a new range of engines.

The proven 998 cc and 1275 cc A-Series engines (the 1275cc unit was heavily modified and saw service in the classic Mini right up to the end of Mini production in October 2000) gave way to the all-new K-series engine. These were available in 1.1 litre (1118 cc ) and 1.4 litre (1396 cc ) 8-valve versions, while a 16-valve engine was available in the GTi (early variants are  SPi while the later MPi version has 103 bhp) and the early GTa. All models used end-on gearboxes designed jointly by Rover and Peugeot. In 1993, a 1.4 PSA TUD diesel from the Citroën AX and Peugeot 106 was launched; this was the first time the Metro had been available with a diesel engine. The Hydragas suspension was finally modified to accept front to rear interconnection in the way that Alex Moulton had intended, to improve handling and ride quality.

A new bodyshell for the replacement car (the AR6 project) was designed. Its styling was influenced by Ital Design, with some similarity to the acclaimed Giorgetto Giugiaro-designed Fiat Punto launched in 1994, and the lower panels of the Peugeot 205, and incorporating the blacked-out pillars and 'floating roof' of the 1989 R8 Rover 200. However, this was cancelled by chairman Graham Day, because British Aerospace (then the Rover Group's new owners) refused to fund it, and the disappointing sales of the Maestro and Montego had not produced expected profits to reinvest. A mockup could be seen at the Canley, Coventry design centre in the 1990s during open days. It appeared as a 'Scoop' photo on the front cover of CAR magazine in the mid-1980s. Project R6, as it became known, would be a more modest update of the 1980 car – the basic bodyshell was retained, but was improved with the addition of new plastic front and rear bumpers, new front wings, new rear lights and bootlid, new front headlamps and bonnet. The interior was altered with a new rounded instrument binnacle and instruments (although the 1984 dashboard moulding remained), new steering wheel, new seats (from the successful Rover 200 series), new door casings and other detail improvements. General build quality, fit and finish was improved enormously from the old Metro and went on to win What Car? "Car of The Year" in 1991.

In many export markets, including Italy and France, the Rover Metro was badged as the Rover 100 series, with the 1.1 known as the Rover 111 and the 1.4 called 114.

Latterly this car has attracted an enthusiastic following including use as a low-cost entry to motor racing. For ultimate performance the 1.8 K-series engine, with standard cams or VVC (Variable Valve Control) system can be fitted (these engines are found in the MGF and Lotus Elise sports cars, as well as various Rovers and MGs).

Rover 100

In December 1994 the revised R6 model appeared. In the United Kingdom, Rover finally scrapped the Metro nameplate, replacing it with a new name, Rover 100, which had been adopted on continental Europe on the Rover Metro's launch in 1990, due to the weakness of the Austin marque in Europe.

The mechanics of the car remained much the same with 1.1 and 1.4 petrol engines and Hydragas suspension, but there was now the option of a Peugeot-sourced 1.5 diesel rather than the previous 1.4. The exterior was altered in an attempt to disguise the car's age, meet the increased cooling requirements of the Peugeot motor and offer a reduced-format Rover family grille. This was achieved through fitment of new front and rear bumpers, sill covers, rear boot handle and headlamps, bonnet and grille.

A variety of bolder paint colours and the use of chrome trim helped give a more upmarket appearance. The interior trim was revised to give a greater impression of quality and luxury, but since the basic architecture had remained unchanged since the original 1980 car it was considered by many as being short on space and outdated in comparison to its most modern rivals (most of which had been replaced with all-new models since the launch of the Rover Metro, and in the cases of the Ford Fiesta and Vauxhall Nova/Corsa, replaced with all-new models twice) It was criticised by the press for its lack of equipment, with front electric windows only available on the range-topping 114 GSi. Rear electric windows were never an option on the 100. Neither were Anti-Lock Brakes, Power Steering or a rev-counter (except the GTa and later manual 114 GSi models) One saving grace for the 100 was the option of full leather trim, a rarity in a small car and coupled with the standard wood veneer dashboard inserts, a tinted glass sunroof and the optional wood veneer door cappings, the 114 GSi made for traditional luxury motoring; an image Rover was trying to retain. The only safety efforts came in the form of an optional drivers airbag, an alarm, a passive engine immobiliser, a removable radio keypad, central locking and side intrusion beams. Overall, the 100 series was considered a rather typical facelift of a car which had been a class leader on launch some years earlier, only to be overtaken by newer cars including the Renault Clio, Fiat Punto and Volkswagen Polo. It was launched only a year before a heavily revised Ford Fiesta.

Rover 114 GTa
A 'warm' version of the 100 called the 114 GTa was available from launch. The main differences over the 114 SLi three-door – which has the same engine – were sports seats, red seatbelts, a rev-counter, sports suspension, a slightly higher top speed, faster acceleration, GSi alloy wheels and GTa badging. It was only available as a three-door.

End of the line

In 1997, the Rover 100 gave a poor performance in Euro NCAP crash tests (despite the improved safety features, including side impact bars in the doors and an optional driver's airbag, the 1970s design was showing its age) – it was at the time the only car tested to receive a one-star Adult Occupant Rating. Other small cars tested at the same time received 2 or 3 stars out of five. The passenger compartment was subjected to severe structural damage in the frontal-offset test and results showed a high risk of injury to all body regions for the driver. Meanwhile, the side impact test also showed high injury risks.

The Rover 100's dismal safety showing was not its only problem by 1997. It was fast falling behind the best cars in its sector when it came to design, build quality, refinement and specification, although it remained strong in terms of fuel economy and affordability. Unlike the Ford Fiesta, Volkswagen Polo and Vauxhall Corsa, the Rover 100 could still provide sub-£7,000 motoring.

Facing a complete collapse of sales, Rover withdrew the 100 from production – marking the end of nearly 18 years of production.

There was no direct replacement for the Metro/100, although the 1995 Rover 200 had been developed inside Rover Cars to serve as a replacement for the 100 as well as the previous 200 model, which was slightly larger. The 100 and 200 were sold concurrently until 1998, when the 100 was withdrawn. When the Rover 200 was facelifted in late 1999 and rebadged as the Rover 25, Rover marketed this as a supermini reflecting the continued, steady, growth of all car classes. The plan was for both the 100 and the 25 to be on the market until the launch of the true replacement for the Metro in the shape of the MINI. However, BMW's sale of Rover put an end to those plans. BMW kept the MINI design and MG Rover's notional successor to the Metro was the Rover 25 and its MG ZR relative.

The gap left by the Metro as a true Rover city car was not filled until late 2003, when the Rover CityRover was launched – it was a 1.4 engined city car built in India alongside the Tata Indica. This model was nowhere near as popular as the Metro or even the Rover 100, and was not included in the revived product range by Nanjing Automobile following MG Rover's bankruptcy in 2005.

Powertrains

MG Metro 6R4 rally car 

Created for the short-lived Group B rally category, the 4WD mid engined MG Metro 6R4 of 1984 (standing for 6-cylinder, Rally, 4-wheel-drive) was a world away from the best selling city car to which only bares superficial cosmetic resemblance to its ordinary counterpart. The competition car effectively only shared the name of the production Metro as it featured a mid-mounted engine with four-wheel drive transmission enclosed within a semi-monocoque seam-welded tubular chassis. The development of this vehicle had been entrusted to Williams Grand Prix Engineering.

The resulting car was shown to the world in May 1985. It was powered by a David Wood designed bespoke 3-litre V6 powerplant which used some of the engine architecture of the Cosworth DFV. It featured twin overhead camshafts and four valves per cylinder. The engine was not turbocharged as the majority of its competitors were, which considered the Metro as "unique." The engine was mounted back to front in the car, with the forward end of the engine facing the hatchback and the gearbox attached conventionally behind it and, therefore, in the middle of the vehicle. The four-wheel-drive was permanently engaged, and drove separate prop shafts to the front and rear differentials. The rear differential was mounted on the side of the engine sump with one driveshaft running through the sump to the nearside rear wheel. Much of the outer bodywork was made of GRP, with the only exception being the roof panels (which were aluminium), the steel doors, and the remaining panels from the original Metro shell. The doors were, however, concealed by plastic airboxes. Indeed, models now on show generally have stickers demonstrating where it is safe to push from when moving the vehicle, so as not to damage the bodywork.

The 6R4 appeared in two guises. A further 20 were taken and built to International specifications which had a recorded output of over 

At its launch in 1985, Rover announced that it would complete the necessary number of cars required for homologation by November of that year. This was undertaken at the group's large manufacturing facility at Longbridge. The car was to participate in the Lombard RAC rally in November 1985, and an example, driven by works driver Tony Pond, finished a highly respectable third, behind two Lancia Delta S4s.

This good start was unfortunately not repeated, and although a 6R4 was entered in rallies at Monte Carlo, Sweden, Portugal and Corsica during the 1986 season, none of the Metros managed to complete a course. The majority of these problems were related to the V6 powerplant which suffered teething issues. Halfway during the 1986 season, Group B was banned (following a series of fatal crashes in which both competitors and spectators lost their lives). From that point on, the 6R4 was always going to be limited in front line competition, although they were run with limited success for the remainder of the year. A number passed into private hands and have proved formidable rally and rallycross cars. Despite the expiry of the 6R4's homologation the MSA still allow the cars to run in competition although engine sizes have been limited to 2800cc (single plenum engines) and 2500cc (multi-plenum engines).

Austin Rover withdrew from the rallying scene at the end of the season, but in 1987 all the parts and engines were sold to Tom Walkinshaw Racing, whereupon the V6 engine reappeared in the Jaguar XJ220, this time with turbochargers added.

Popularity 

The Metro remained one of Britain's most popular cars throughout its production life, even during its final year when it was among the oldest designs on sale in the country. During its early years, the Austin Metro was Britain's most popular small car; often outselling the Ford Fiesta. It was still one of Britain's best selling cars by the time it was replaced by the Rover 100 in late 1994, with almost 1,500,000 having been sold (an average of more than 100,000 per year). However, despite reasonable numbers being sold in France and Italy, overall sales in Europe were modest in comparison to established rivals such as the Fiesta (which typically sold 500,000 units per year across Europe), meaning that BL still could not realise the true economies of scale.

Much debate among automotive historians has taken place over whether BL's decision to push the Metro's development programme ahead of the potentially more profitable Maestro/Montego models was justified. As a result of this, both those models did not arrive on the market until 1983/84, after having been in development since 1976 with a view of being launched around 1980. By the time of their launch, they were soon out of step both stylistically and from an engineering perspective when compared to the market-leading cars in their sectors.

The Metro's popularity endured in spite of its failure to match the durability of its contemporary rivals, notably the Nissan Micra (K10) and VW Polo Mk.2. This is well illustrated by the findings of Auto Express's 2006 survey which named the Metro as Britain's seventh-most scrapped car of the last thirty years. Just 21,468 versions of the original 1980–1990 Metro were still in working order at the time of the survey, despite around 1,000,000 being sold. Nearly seven years on, that figure has inevitably declined further, with the number remaining as of 2013 now down to less than 2,000.

Many Metros (particularly the pre-1990 Austin models) have been scrapped as a result of the bodyshell's vulnerability to rust. Pre-1989 cars could not run on unleaded fuel either without expensive conversion of the cylinder head or the use of additives.  When lead replacement petrol was withdrawn from sale in 1997 many owners simply scrapped the cars.  Metros built before 1990 use the same engine and transmission package as the Mini, hence they have become popular donor cars for Mini restorations and Mini-based kit cars; and as a result, thousands of Metros were dismantled purely for their engines to keep Minis on the road. Many Metros were written off by joyriders, as the car's minimal security made it notoriously easy to steal.

Including the post-1994 Rover 100 Series models, a total of just under 1,500,000 Metros were sold in the UK in less than twenty years, making it the seventh-most popular car ever sold there.

Lady Diana Spencer (later Diana, Princess of Wales) owned a red W-registered Metro before her engagement to Prince Charles. This car is in the Museum of British Road Transport, Coventry.

References

Metro
Hatchbacks
Subcompact cars
Cars introduced in 1980
Rally cars
Group B cars
Touring cars
1990s cars
Front-wheel-drive vehicles
Euro NCAP superminis
de:Rover 100er-Serie
Cars discontinued in 1998